Bill Mathis (December 10, 1938 – October 20, 2020) was an American professional football player who was a running back for the New York Titans/Jets in the American Football League (AFL). He played college football for the Clemson Tigers. He started his professional career with the Titans, and played his entire career with the AFL's New York franchise. One of four Titans who remained with the New York Jets to play in and win a Super Bowl, Mathis led the AFL in carries in 1961 and was selected by his peers to the Sporting News 1961 AFL All-League team.  He was an AFL Eastern Division All-Star in 1961 and 1963.  Mathis had a collarbone broken in the third game of 1961, against the Boston Patriots.  He played in the next game, and in fact in all the remaining games of the season.

That persistence allowed him to gain a roster spot year after year, and end his career in 1969 after winning Super Bowl III.  He is one of twenty players who were in the AFL for its entire ten-year existence, and seven players who played their entire AFL careers for one franchise. He was inducted into the Clemson University Hall of Fame, South Carolina Hall of Fame, and the Georgia Hall of Fame. 

After retiring from football, Mathis began a career on Wall Street, starting at the firm Cogan, Berlind, Weill & Levitt.

See also
Other American Football League players

References

External links
Mathis' jersey from his 1961 injury

1938 births
2020 deaths
People from Greenville, Georgia
People from Manchester, Georgia
Sportspeople from the Atlanta metropolitan area
Sportspeople from Rocky Mount, North Carolina
Players of American football from Georgia (U.S. state)
Clemson Tigers football players
New York Titans (AFL) players
New York Jets players
American Football League players
American Football League All-Star players
American Football League All-League players
Track and field athletes from Georgia (U.S. state)
USA Outdoor Track and Field Championships winners